SYN Nation was an Australian community radio station broadcasting to Melbourne, Victoria. First broadcast in April 2014, the station was operated by SYN Media, with programming presented entirely by volunteers aged 12–25 years old. The station broadcast from studios on the campus of RMIT University, alongside sister station SYN 90.7. The two stations were merged in April 2019 to create SYN.

History
On 1 April 2014, the station launched on DAB+ digital radio. The launch of SYN Nation was attended by then-Minister for Communications Malcolm Turnbull, federal MP for Melbourne Adam Bandt, and Melbourne Lord Mayor Robert Doyle. Content for the station was supplied by volunteers at Bay FM Byron Bay, 2XX FM Canberra, Edge Radio Hobart, Gippsland FM Morwell, and 3WAY FM Warrnambool, as well as by Melbourne volunteers. In 2015, the station began broadcasting content from Wangki Yupurnanupurru Radio Fitzroy Crossing and 107.9 Radio Fremantle Fremantle, Western Australia.

On 16 April 2019, SYN Media announced that SYN Nation would merge with SYN 90.7 to create a single station, broadcasting on 90.7FM and DAB+ digital radio in Melbourne. The newly merged SYN commenced broadcasting on 22 April 2019.

Flagship programming (at time of closure)
Melbourne
Art Smitten (Arts and culture)
The Naughty Rude Show (Sex and relationships)
Represent (Political discussion)
Player One (Video game discussion)

Regional
 The Edge (News & Current Affairs)

See also
Community radio
Digital radio in Australia
College radio

References

External links
SYN Nation website

Nation
Radio stations in Melbourne
Radio stations established in 2014
Radio stations disestablished in 2019
Defunct radio stations in Australia
2014 establishments in Australia
2019 disestablishments in Australia